Semeniškiai is a village in Panevėžys County, in northeastern Lithuania. According to the 2011 census, the village has a population of 3 people. Jonas Mekas, a Lithuanian American filmmaker, poet, and artist who has often been called "the godfather of American avant-garde cinema" was born in Semeniškiai in 1922. His work has been exhibited in museums and at festivals worldwide.

References

Villages in Panevėžys County
Biržai District Municipality